Clifford Grobstein (July 20, 1916 – September 6, 1998) was an American biologist, a cancer researcher, a member of the National Academies of Sciences.

Early life and education 
On July 20, 1916, Grobstein was born in New York City, New York. He graduated from the City College of New York in 1936 with a B.S. degree in biology. He received his M.S. and Ph.D. degrees in zoology from the University of California at Los Angeles.

Career 
Grobstein was the chairman of the biology department and the dean of the school of medicine at the University of California at San Diego.
He was also a member of the National Academy of Medicine and the American Academy of Arts and Sciences.
The New York Times said that Grobstein "made important contributions to the study of cancer and of developmental biology."
He is also known and respected by his fellow scientists for raising and framing ethical questions dealing with applications of the experimental biology.
The National Academies Press said he "was a leading American developmental biologist of the last half of the twentieth century".

Rewards and distinctions 
 1966 - elected to the National Academy of Sciences
 elected to the National Academy of Medicine
 elected to the American Academy of Arts and Sciences
 the Brachet Medal by the Belgium Royal Society
 the Anniversary Medal from City College of New York

References 

1916 births
1998 deaths
Members of the United States National Academy of Sciences
American biologists
20th-century biologists
City College of New York alumni
University of California, Los Angeles alumni
University of California, San Diego faculty
Members of the National Academy of Medicine